Bruce Sterling Woodcock (born 1970) is an American computer and video games industry analyst, best known for his work on subscription tracking of massively multiplayer online games via his website MMOGCHART.COM.

Biography 
Woodcock was born in the small farming community of Sullivan, Missouri, on June 20, 1970, the youngest of three children to Myron and Mary Woodcock.  He graduated from Sullivan Senior High School in 1988, and then went on to Purdue University, studying physics, philosophy, and computer science.  In 1989, he became involved in internet gaming on early MUDs, and in 1990, was briefly running two of the largest TinyMUDs of the time, TinyMUD Classic and Islandia. His original online handle was Sir Bruce Sterling, which was later shortened to Sir Bruce when he began posting on message boards.

Leaving college early, he moved to Colorado Springs, Colorado, in 1991, where he began a career in information technology.  In 1993, he moved to San Jose, California, where he subsequently worked as a system administrator at early internet service provider Netcom (USA), and then Network Appliance, eventually leaving in 1997 with $250,000 in stock options.  He started to maintain a presence on the Yahoo! financial message boards as he closely tracked the performance of Network Appliance, helped the company's fortunes, and built his own portfolio to $3 million.

With the advent of the MMOGs, Chron X and Ultima Online in 1997, Woodcock became a player and beta-tester for this genre of game.  He invested in and joined the Board of Directors for Playnet and their game World War II Online, and in August 2002, began his research, reporting, and tracking of MMOG subscription numbers, which has become a standard of reference both inside and outside the MMOG industry.  In November 2004 his work was moved to its own dedicated website, MMOGCHART.COM. The site has not been updated since May 2008.

Woodcock currently lives in San Jose, working as an independent game consultant and analyst for the MMOG industry.  He is a member of the International Game Developers Association, and has spoken on game industry topics at trade shows such as the Austin Game Conference.

Public speaker 
 "What the Market Research Tells Us - Where MMOs are Going and How Are we Going to Get There" (Speaker), Austin Game Conference, September 6, 2006
 "Building Massively Multiplayer Games on a Budget" (Panelist), Austin Game Conference, September 10, 2004
 "Massively Multiplayer Games on a Shoestring Budget" (Panelist), Austin Game Conference, September 11, 2003

Works 
 "An Analysis of MMOG Subscription Growth", MMOGCHART.COM, 2002 - 2008 
 "Confessions of an MMOG Cross-Dresser", The Escapist #77, December, 2006
 "Is Rape Wrong on Azeroth?", The Escapist #69, October, 2006
 "IGDA 2004 Persistent Worlds Whitepaper", contributor, January, 2005
 "Illusions of Reality", Quanta #3, February, 1990
 Grimtooth's Traps Too, December 1982, Flying Buffalo Computer-Conflict Simulation, contributor, The Catastrophic Keyhole,

References 
 MMOGCHART.COM(Bruce Woodcock's website) 
 Biography at Austin Game Conference website
 "Network Appliance's Knight of the Message Boards", July 3, 2000 - Profile of Woodcock in Business Week
 "Race to build Stormreach" by Hiawatha Bay, The Boston Globe, June 8, 2005
 "Can Mickey and Frodo revive virtual worlds?" by John Borland, CNET News.com, May 31, 2005
 "Everything You Need to MMO" by Evan Shamoon, Game Developer Magazine, Volume 12 Number 4, April 2005
 "Student of the Game" by Daniel Morris, PC Gamer, Issue 12 Number 4, April 2005
 "Massively Multiplying Online Games Face Age of Cannibalization" by Steve Smith, Electronic Gaming Business, August 25, 2004
 "Multiplayer Online Games: Let in the Cannibals" by Steve Smith, Electronic Gaming Business, April 7, 2004
 "Interactive Multi-User Computer Games" by Dr. Richard Bartle, December 1990 (Woodcock is interviewed during his early TinyMUD days.)

1970 births
Living people
People from Sullivan, Missouri
American critics
Video game critics
MUD developers